Hissaro-Alay is a mountain system in Central Asia, part of the Pamir-Alay.

Location 
Hissaro-Alay is located west of the Pamirs, between the Fergana Valley in the north, the Karshi Steppe, the Tajik Depression and the Alay Valley in the south. The eastern part of the system is located on the territory of Kyrgyzstan, the middle - in Tajikistan and the western - in Uzbekistan.

History 
Neolithic cultures, such as Hissar have inhabited the Hissaro-Alay mountain area between 6-2 millennia BCE whose economy consisted of sheep and goat pastoralism.

Ridges 
source:

References 

Mountains of Kyrgyzstan
Mountains of Tajikistan
Mountains of Uzbekistan